Patriomanidae ("fathers of pangolins") is a extinct family of pangolins from superfamily Manoidea that includes two extinct genera Patriomanis and Cryptomanis.

Taxonomy 
 Family: †Patriomanidae
 Genus: †Cryptomanis
 †Cryptomanis gobiensis
 Genus: †Patriomanis
 †Patriomanis americana

Phylogeny 
Phylogenetic position of family Patriomanidae within superfamily Manoidea.

References 

Prehistoric pangolins
Prehistoric mammal families